Blood at the Root: A Racial Cleansing in America is a 2016 non-fiction book written by Patrick Phillips investigating the 1912 racial conflict in Forsyth County, Georgia, the ensuing racial cleansing of the county, and later developments including the 1987 Forsyth County protests.

Overview
In September 1912 in Forsyth County, Georgia, a young white girl was assaulted, raped, and later died. Following the coerced confession of a young black man, an alleged accomplice was lynched. What then followed was bands of white "night riders" that drove the black citizens out of the county, via arson and terror. The title Blood at the Root comes from the song Strange Fruit about the lynchings of African Americans in the South.

Summary

Reviews 
Carol Anderson, reviewing the book for The New York Times, said it "meticulously and elegantly reveals the power of white supremacy in its many guises." Anderson commented that some of the book was "weighed down by supposition and tangents", noting that the author "is hampered by the scarce records, biased contemporary newspaper reporting, traumatized family memories and oral histories that are few and far between."

Notes

References

Further reading

External links
 Book page at W. W. Norton & Company

2016 non-fiction books
English-language books
Non-fiction books about racism
American non-fiction books
W. W. Norton & Company books